Josep Lobató i Pérez (born 16 June 1977 in Esplugues de Llobregat) is a Spanish radio and television presenter.

He studied design and combined these studies with several courses of communications and show presenting.

He started in radio programs when he was 16 years old and has taken part in many radio or television programs and published several books. He has also participated in university conferences and some publications.

His radio program Ponte a Prueba (Put Yourself to the Test) won an Ondas Price for Best Radio Program in 2007.

Personal life

In 2015, Josep was diagnosed with a demyelinating disease that causes problems with his ability to speak. The effects of the disease meant Josep was no longer able to continue his broadcast media work. Since then, he has undergone speech therapy.

Television programs
 Cuatro - "20P", 2009
 Cuatro - "La batalla de los coros" 2009.
 Cuatro - "Circus, Más difícil todavía" 2008
 TVE 1 - "¡Quiero Bailar!" 2008
 Cuatro  - "Money, money" 2007/2008
 Cuatro  - "El Sexómetro" 2007
 Cuatro - "Channel Fresh" 2007
 TV3 - "Prohibit als tímids" 2006
 Flaix TV - "FlaixMania" 2001/2005
Discovery Channel - "Discovery en el Fòrum" 2004

Radio programs
 Happy FM - "Zona Vip" Actualmente
 Europa FM - "Ponte A Prueba" 2006-2008
 Ràdio Flaixbac - "Prohibit Als Pares" 2003/2006
 COM Ràdio - "Bon dia lluna" ("Balli qui pugui") 1999
 Top Radio - 1998

Books
 "Ponte A Prueba 2" (Ediciones del Bronce / Editorial Planeta/2008)
 "Ponte A Prueba, Confidencial" (Ediciones del Bronce / Editorial Planeta/2007)
 "Ponte A Prueba, El libro" (Ediciones del Bronce / Editorial Planeta/2007)
 "Posa't A Prova" (Edicions Columna / Editorial Planeta/2007)
 "Som PAP, la nostra vida, el nostre rotllo" (RBA/2006)
 "Prohibit als Pares" (RBA/2005)

References

External links

Official website

1977 births
Living people
Spanish television presenters
Radio personalities from Catalonia